National Association of Manufacturers v. Department of Defense, 583 U.S. ___ (2018), is a United States Supreme Court case. At issue is which court will hear cases that define the term Waters of the United States for the purpose of rule making, to the exclusion of the states. The case is the successor to North Dakota v. EPA, among others.

Facts and prior history
The United States Army Corps of Engineers and the Environmental Protection Agency engaged in rule making to define Waters of the United States for the purpose of promulgating other environmental rules.  The State of North Dakota, joined by other states, challenged the definition. The states won an injunction which was subsequently challenged in the Sixth Circuit Court of Appeals.  This case will settle the matter of jurisdiction.

The Court heard oral arguments on October 11, 2017.

Opinion of the Court 
The Court issued an opinion on January 22, 2018. Associate Justice Sonia Sotomayor authored the unanimous opinion of the Court.

References

External links 
 

United States Supreme Court cases
United States Supreme Court cases of the Roberts Court
2018 in United States case law
United States environmental case law